Something for Nothing is the debut album by French rock band Chunk! No, Captain Chunk!. It was released on November 1, 2010.

Background 
After the internet success of their self-titled EP, the band opted to record a studio album, re-recording the song "MILF" from the EP. A 5-song sampler of the album was released for free download on various internet sites in May 2010. The band used music they had written in the few years they have been a band for the album, they didn't write any new songs. The album was self-produced by their singer Bert Poncet He later commented in an interview with Rock Sound saying: "I was producing the songs using a book that was teaching me how to mix records. If it wasn't in the book, I went online to learn the rest".

Release 
After signing to Fearless Records with a global deal in 2011, they re-released the album on July 19, 2011.  The re-release featured a brand new album artwork and a different track listing, replacing "MILF" and "Alex Kidd in Miracle World" with the song "Make Them Believe", which was a Japanese bonus track on the original release.  To coincide with the re-release, the band released a music video for the single "Captain Blood", which was the lead single off the re-release, and overall second single of the album. In November and December, the group supported Blessthefall on the Fearless Friends Tour in the US. In January and February 2012, the group supported Attack Attack! on their US tour.

Track listing

Personnel 
Chunk! No, Captain Chunk
 Bertrand Poncet – lead vocals, keyboards
 Paul Wilson – rhythm guitar, backing vocals
 Éric Poncet – lead guitar, backing vocals
 Mathias Rigal – bass guitar
 Jonathan Donnaes – drums, percussion

Additional vocalists
 Alex of The Earl Grey (For All We Know)
 Popi of Notimefor  (Summer Heat)
 Alvin of Notimefor (For All We Know & Summer Heat)
 Leo of Mary Has a Gun (For All We Know)
 Gang vocals: Chunk! No, Captain Chunk! with 'XPDCX Crew'

Recording
 Produced by Bertrand Poncet and Chunk! No, Captain Chunk!
 Recorded by Bertrand Poncet
 Mixed by Andrew Wade
 Mastered by Andy VanDette

References

External links 
 Album information from Spirit-Of-Rock.com
 Something for Nothing on AllMusic
 An Interview with Chunk! No, Captain Chunk

Fearless Records albums
InVogue Records albums
Chunk! No, Captain Chunk! albums
2010 debut albums